Sick Wid It's Greatest Hits is a compilation album presented by American rap label Sick Wid It Records. It was released on November 9, 1999, on Sick Wid It and Jive Records. The album was produced by D-Shot, Femi Ojetunde, Kevin Gardner, Mike Mosley, Redwine, Roger Troutman, Sam Bostic, Studio Ton and Tone Capone. It features performances by Spice 1, Too Short, Kurupt, Daryl Hall, E-40, B-Legit, Celly Cel, Levitti, Bo–Roc, Roger Troutman and Mac Shawn.

Critical reception 

Allmusic – "Sick Wid It...albums sold steadily throughout the...'90s, mainly because the label offered straight-up West Coast gangsta with no muss, fuss, or apologies. Released in the waning months of the decade, Sick Wid It's Greatest Hits compiles the label's best-known singles and R&B/Rap chart hits, which mainly breaks down to three songs from E-40, three songs from Click, three songs from B-Legit, two from D-Shot, two from Celly Cel, and one from Suga T...it's not bad and certainly the cream of the Sick Wid It crop, which makes it a good choice for aficionados of the style or to anyone looking to dig a little deeper than Death Row and No Limit."

Track listing 
 "Sprinkle Me" (E-40 featuring Suga-T) – 4:10 (from the album In a Major Way)
 "Hurricane" (The Click) – 4:21 (from the album Game Related)
 "City 2 City" (B-Legit featuring Levitti) – 3:49 (from the album The Hemp Museum)
 "The Worldwide Playaz" (D-Shot featuring Spice 1, Too Short & Bo–Roc) – 4:34 (from the album Six Figures)
 "Hustlas and Tendas" (Suga-T featuring B-Legit, Mac Shawn & G-Note) – 3:38 (from the album Paper Chasin')
 "Captain Save a Hoe" (E-40 featuring The Click) – 4:50 (from the album The Mail Man)
 "It's Goin' Down" (Celly Cel) – 5:19 (from the album Killa Kali)
 "Mr. Flamboyant" (E-40) – 6:01 (from the album Mr. Flamboyant)
 "Check It Out" (B-Legit featuring Kurupt & E-40) – 5:20 (from the album The Hemp Museum)
 "(I'll Be Yo') Huckleberry" (D-Shot featuring E-40, Levitti & Saulter Twins) – 4:33 (from the album Booty Call)
 "Ghetto Smile" (B-Legit featuring Daryl Hall) – 4:14 (from the album Dangerous Ground)
 "Scandalous" (The Click featuring Roger Troutman) – 5:06 (from the album Game Related)
 "Things'll Never Change" (E-40 featuring Bo–Roc) – 5:03 (from the album Tha Hall of Game)
 "Heat 4 Yo Azz" (Celly Cel) – 4:20 (from the album Heat 4 Yo Azz)
 "Way Too Vicious" (B-Legit featuring E-40) – 4:51 (from the album Tryin' to Get a Buck)

Personnel 

B-Legit – Performer
Sam Bostic – Producer
Celly Cel – Performer
The Click – Performer
D-Shot – Producer, Performer
E-40 – Vocals, Performer
G-Note – Performer
Kevin Gardner – Producer
Daryl Hall – Performer
Kerry – Background Vocals
Kurupt – Performer
Levitti - Performer
Mac Shawn – Performer

Mike Mosley – Producer
Femi Ojetunde – Producer
One Drop Scott – Drum Programming, Mixing Engineer
Redwine – Producer
Bo–Roc – Background Vocals, Performer
Spice 1 – Performer
Studio Ton – Producer, Mixing Engineer, Keyboards, Drum Programming
Suga-T – Performer
Tone Capone – Keyboards, Producer
Too Short – Performer
Marvin Whitemon – Performer

References

External links 
[ Sick Wid It's Greatest Hits] at Allmusic
Sick Wid It's Greatest Hits at Tower Records

Record label compilation albums
1999 greatest hits albums
Albums produced by Studio Ton
Gangsta rap compilation albums
West Coast hip hop compilation albums
Jive Records compilation albums
Sick Wid It Records compilation albums